Saint Joseph Parish Church, also known as San Jose Parish Church, is a Roman Catholic church located at Poblacion, La Trinidad, Benguet in the Philippines. The church is under the jurisdiction of the Roman Catholic Diocese of Baguio, and is dedicated to Saint Joseph, Husband of Mary.

References

Roman Catholic churches in Benguet